Salvation is the third studio album by Swedish post-metal band Cult of Luna, released on Earache Records in 2004; on October 4 in Europe, and October 10 in the United States.

Salvation was critically acclaimed upon its release, with Metal Hammer awarding it 10/10, the first album to receive the accolade since Metallica's Black Album.

A music video was recorded for "Leave Me Here", directed by Anders Forsman and Linus Johansson. It premiered on April 30, 2005 on MTV2 and Fuse TV.

Track listing
All tracks written by Cult of Luna.

Personnel

Cult of Luna
 Thomas Hedlund – drums and percussion
 Andreas Johansson – bass
 Magnus Lindberg – percussion, mixing and production
 Erik Olofsson – guitar and graphic design
 Johannes Persson – guitar and vocals
 Klas Rydberg – vocals
 Anders Teglund – keyboards

Other personnel
Per Gustafsson – graphic design
Pelle Henricsson – mastering
Anna Ledin – photography

References

Cult of Luna albums
2004 albums
Earache Records albums